Li Chen may refer to:

 Emperor Xuānzong of Tang (810–859), emperor of the Tang dynasty
 Li Chen (artist) (born 1963), Taiwanese sculptor
 Li Chen (actor) (born 1978), Chinese actor
 Li Chen (diplomat), Chinese diplomat
 Li Chen, a character played by Nelson Lee in the 1997–2003 HBO series Oz
 Li Chen (footballer), Chinese footballer
 Chen Li (singer) Chinese singer, song writer

See also
 Lichen (disambiguation)
 Li Zhen (disambiguation), spelled "Li Chen" in Wade–Giles romanization
 Chen Li (disambiguation)